Aymen Ben Amor (born 7 September 1985) is a Tunisian footballer who plays as right back for FC Hammamet.

Honours
Club
CAF Champions League: 2011
CAF Confederation Cup: 2007, 2008
Tunisian Ligue 1: 2009–10, 10–11, 11–12
Tunisian Cup: 2008-09, 2010–11

References

External links
 
 

1985 births
Living people
People from Sidi Bouzid
Tunisian footballers
Association football defenders
CS Sfaxien players
Espérance Sportive de Tunis players
US Monastir (football) players
EO Sidi Bouzid players
FC Hammamet players